The 2017 Georgia Bulldogs football team represented the University of Georgia in the 2017 NCAA Division I FBS football season. The Bulldogs played their home games at Sanford Stadium in Athens, Georgia and competed in the Eastern Division of the Southeastern Conference (SEC). They were led by second-year head coach Kirby Smart.

The Bulldogs notched their 800th win in program history with a 41–0 victory over Tennessee on September 30, 2017.

The 2017 Georgia Bulldogs were crowned Southeastern Conference Champions on December 2, 2017, with a postseason win over the Auburn Tigers, against whom they had suffered their only defeat in the regular season. This was their first conference title since 2005. After the win against Auburn, 2017 became only the fifth season in which Georgia beat all of its traditional rivals (Auburn, Florida, Georgia Tech, Tennessee) in the same season (previously 1980, 1982, 2011, 2012).

Georgia received its first ever College Football Playoff appearance against Oklahoma in the school's first Rose Bowl Game since the 1942 season. Georgia won by a score of 54–48 in double overtime. The Bulldogs reached the National Championship game for the first time since 1982, but lost to Alabama in overtime.

Previous season
The 2016 Georgia Bulldogs football team finished the regular season 8–5, with losses to Ole Miss, Tennessee, Vanderbilt, Florida, and Georgia Tech. Key wins included defeating North Carolina 33–24 to start the season in the Chick-fil-A Kickoff Game at the Georgia Dome, #8 Auburn 13–7, and TCU 31–23 in the Liberty Bowl in Memphis. Georgia did not receive a bid to the SEC Championship due to the four SEC losses (Ole Miss, Tennessee, Vanderbilt, and Florida). Instead, two loss Florida went to the SEC championship game. The 2016 SEC Championship Game saw Alabama beat Florida 54–16. However, the Bulldogs became bowl eligible after their win against Auburn on November 12 and were invited to play in the Liberty Bowl against the TCU of the Big 12 Conference. Georgia rallied from a 16–7 first half deficit to win the game 31–23 behind Nick Chubb running for 142 yards and 1 TD as well as Sony Michel having 126 total yards of offense (87 rushing, 39 receiving) and 2 TD's.

Coaching changes
Following the 2016 football season, defensive Line Coach Tracy Rocker was replaced by Tray Scott, who had coached at North Carolina from 2015 to 2016. Rocker was the defensive line Coach at Georgia from 2014 to 2016. He previously coached the Defensive line for the Tennessee Titans (2011–2013), Auburn (2009–2010), Ole Miss 2008, Arkansas (2003–2007), Cincinnati 2002, Troy State (1997–2001) & West Alabama (1994–1996). Scott was hired by Hugh Freeze at Ole Miss but stayed there less than 2 weeks before accepting the position from Kirby Smart at Georgia and leaving. Before his time with the North Carolina where they won the 2015 Coastal Division Championship and an 11–3 record, Scott was the Defensive Line Coach at UT Martin from 2013 to 2014. Scott is from Crossett, Arkansas where he played for Arkansas Tech from 2003 to 2007.

Schedule
Georgia announced its 2017 football schedule on September 13, 2016. The 2017 schedule consisted of 6 home games, 5 away, and 1 neutral site game in the regular season. The Bulldogs hosted SEC foes Kentucky, Mississippi State, Missouri, and South Carolina, and traveled to Auburn, Tennessee, and Vanderbilt. Georgia faced Florida in Jacksonville, Florida.

The Bulldogs played four non–conference games, hosting Appalachian State from the Sun Belt Conference in the first meeting since 2013 and Samford from the Southern Conference. Georgia traveled to Georgia Tech from the Atlantic Coast Conference and independent Notre Dame in the first meeting since the 1981 Sugar Bowl. In their most recent matches, Georgia defeated Appalachian State 45–6 in 2013, Notre Dame 17–10 for the 1980 National Championship, and lost to Georgia Tech 28–27 at Sanford Stadium in 2016.

From the SEC West, Georgia played Mississippi State for the first time since 2011 when they beat Mississippi State 24–10 as well as Auburn in their annual Deep South's Oldest Rivalry, leading the series 57–55–8 after winning 3 straight times against Auburn including last year's win against #8 Auburn 13–7 in Sanford Stadium.

Schedule Source:

Game summaries

Appalachian State

On September 2, 2017, Georgia faced Appalachian State University. Returning starting QB Jacob Eason suffered a knee injury early into the game, prompting true freshman QB Jake Fromm to enter. The freshman went 10 of 15 for 143 yards and a touchdown, and the defense kept the Mountaineers off the scoreboard for most of the game as the Bulldogs took care of business in Athens.

Notre Dame

Georgia traveled to Notre Dame for the first game between the two teams since the 1981 Sugar Bowl, which gave the No. 1 Bulldogs the 1980 National Championship. An estimated 70,000 Georgia fans traveled with the Bulldogs for the team's first trip north of the Mason-Dixon line in over 50 years. Notre Dame had just gained over 400 rushing yards in a blowout of Temple the week before, but Georgia's dominant front seven was able to hold Notre Dame's powerful rushing attack to just 55 yards in the victory. Rodrigo Blankenship kicked the game winning field goal late in the fourth quarter, and linebacker Lorenzo Carter recovered a fumble forced by Davin Bellamy on the ensuing drive to seal the game.

Samford

Georgia dominated the Samford Bulldogs in Athens. Jake Fromm was efficient, going 8 of 13 for 165 yards and three touchdowns, and senior RB Nick Chubb gained 131 yards and two touchdowns on 16 carries.

Mississippi State

Fresh off of three dominant victories in a row, including a 37–7 blowout of LSU, Mississippi State came into Athens as one of the hottest teams in the country. Georgia almost immediately took control, however, with a 59-yard touchdown pass from Jake Fromm to Terry Godwin on their first play from scrimmage. Fromm would go 9 of 12 for 201 yards and two touchdowns as Georgia's defense suffocated Mississippi State's offense in the home win.

Tennessee

Georgia traveled to Knoxville in search of payback for a heartbreaking loss the year before. The result was a 41–0 shutout of the Volunteers, their first shutout since 1994 and their worst home loss in over a century. Jake Fromm accounted for three total touchdowns while the Georgia defense held Tennessee to just 142 yards of offense. This was Georgia's largest margin of victory against the rival Volunteers since the 1981 season, when Georgia won 44–0.

Vanderbilt

For the second week in a row, Georgia traveled to an opposing SEC stadium to avenge a loss from the year before. This time, Georgia blew out Vanderbilt in Nashville. Georgia's running backs had a field day as Nick Chubb and Sony Michel combined for nearly 300 yards and three touchdowns, and the team gained a total of 423 rushing yards in the blowout win.

Missouri

The game started out surprisingly close thanks to the strong arm of Drew Lock as Missouri was able to match Georgia score-for-score into the second quarter. Georgia began to pull away by halftime, however, as the Bulldogs gained 696 total yards in the victory, the second-most in school history.

Florida

Georgia broke its three-game losing streak to Florida with a dominant performance in Jacksonville, their best win in the series since 1982. Senior RB Sony Michel had one of the best games of his career, rushing for 137 yards and two touchdowns on a mere 6 carries, and the Georgia defense dominated once again. Florida's defeat in this game sealed the fate of the Gators' Head Coach Jim McElwain, who was fired within a few days of the crushing loss.

South Carolina

Ranked No. 1 in the College Football Playoff Poll for the first time ever, and for the first time in any poll since the beginning of the 2008 season, Georgia defeated South Carolina in Athens behind a balanced offensive attack. Jake Fromm completed 16 of 22 passes for 196 yards and two touchdowns, while the duo of Sony Michel and Nick Chubb combined for 183 yards. The win, combined with a Kentucky loss on the same day, clinched the SEC East for Georgia.

Auburn

The No. 10 Auburn Tigers ended a three-game losing streak against the Bulldogs as they dominated No. 1 Georgia at home. Georgia scored a quick touchdown on their first drive but struggled to touch the scoreboard for the remainder of the game. Auburn took advantage of huge special teams blunders by Georgia and held Nick Chubb and Sony Michel to a combined 48 yards on the ground. Auburn RB Kerryon Johnson shredded the Georgia defense for 233 total yards in the blowout victory.

Kentucky

Georgia bounced back from their crushing loss to Auburn with a dominant home win over Kentucky. Sony Michel and Nick Chubb had a huge day on the ground, combining for 238 rushing yards and five touchdowns, and the Georgia defense held Kentucky's physical offense to 124 yards on the ground.

Georgia Tech

The No. 7 Bulldogs avenged their final loss of the previous season with a blowout win over Georgia Tech in Atlanta. Jake Fromm was a very efficient 12 of 16 for 224 yards and two touchdowns, while Georgia's running backs added 247 yards and three touchdowns in the win. The Georgia defense was strong, holding Georgia Tech to a season-low 226 yards of total offense

Auburn (SEC Championship Game)

After losing a terribly one-sided game to Auburn in the regular season, No. 6 Georgia had a chance to redeem themselves with a rematch against No. 2 Auburn in the SEC Championship game. Auburn started off strong, going 75 yards on 10 plays for a touchdown on their first drive. However, in a complete reversal of the regular season game, Auburn was unable to score from there on out. Georgia grabbed the momentum after recovering an Auburn fumble at the beginning of the second quarter, and the Bulldogs would go on to score 28 unanswered points in a blowout victory. This time, the Georgia defense held a banged-up Kerryon Johnson to just 45 total yards, while Sony Michel and Nick Chubb each had over 80 total yards of their own. True freshman QB Jake Fromm played well in the biggest game of his career, going 16 of 22 for 183 yards and two touchdowns. Another true freshman, D'Andre Swift, all but assured Georgia's victory with a 64-yard 4th quarter touchdown run to put the Bulldogs up by three scores. The win gave Georgia its first SEC title since 2005 and secured a spot for Georgia in the 2018 College Football Playoff.

Oklahoma (Rose Bowl–CFP Semifinal)

On January 1, 2018, Georgia defeated Oklahoma 54–48 in a College Football Playoff semifinal game played at the Rose Bowl in Pasadena, California. Oklahoma led by 14 points at halftime, but Georgia used a strong running game to storm back in the second half. The game was tied at 45 at the end of regulation time. After the teams traded field goals in the first overtime period, Georgia prevailed on a 27-yard Sony Michel touchdown run in double overtime following an Oklahoma field goal attempt blocked by Lorenzo Carter. The senior duo of Chubb and Michel combined for 367 total yards and 6 touchdowns in the highest-scoring Rose Bowl of all time.

Alabama (CFP National Championship Game)

Georgia charged out to a 13–0 half time lead. Alabama coach Nick Saban made a gutsy call at the half to change QBs, going with freshman Tua Tagovailoa. Alabama chipped away at the Georgia lead in the second half eventually scoring the game tying TD on a 4th and goal from the 6 yard line late in the contest. Alabama had a chance to win it in regulation but missed a short field goal and the game was sent to OT. Georgia kicker Rodrigo Blankenship hit a 51-yard field goal, setting a National Championship game record to give the Bulldogs a 3-point lead in OT. On Alabama's OT possession they scored a TD on second down that won the game and gave Alabama their 5th National Championship under Nick Saban.

Roster

Rankings

Awards and honors

2018 NFL Draft

The 2018 NFL Draft was held on April 26–28 in Arlington, Texas. Six Georgia players were selected as part of the draft, and another five were signed to NFL teams as undrafted free agents.

References

Southeastern Conference football champion seasons
Georgia
Georgia Bulldogs football seasons
Rose Bowl champion seasons
Georgia Bulldogs football